"Whenever You Need Somebody" is a song written and produced by Stock Aitken Waterman, which became successful for two of their artists.

O'Chi Brown version 

The song was originally written for British singer O'Chi Brown, and released in November 1985 on Magnetic Records. It became a minor hit for Brown in the UK Singles Chart, peaking at No. 97 there. According to Brown, the popularity of the track "caught people [in the industry] by surprise", with producer Pete Waterman left "on the warpath" over the lack of support for the track.

The single was later released in 1986 in the US, where it became a #1 hit on the dance charts. It failed to chart on the Billboard Hot 100, however, due to a lack of available stock in record stores.  According to Brown, "They didn't have the physical disc, they'd run out of the physical discs."

The song was later included in Brown's studio album O'Chi, released in 1986.

When the song was covered by Rick Astley in 1987, Magnet reissued the single in 12" format with new mixes in late 1987.

Discussing Astley's success with the track she'd originated, Brown complimented the singer on his voice and praised the chart performance of his cover, but noted, "I like mine better, what can I tell you? 

"Rick's got a great voice, but I just felt that the song suited a woman, and I felt it suited my voice. I'm not going to say mine was better, but I liked mine more."

Rick Astley version 

In 1987, Rick Astley covered the song, as SAW rushed to gather strong follow up material in the wake of the unexpected global mega-success of "Never Gonna Give You Up". The song would become the title track and second single from Astley's multi-million selling debut album of the same name, also written and produced by Stock Aitken Waterman. It was a successful European hit for Astley, reaching No. 1 in seven countries, continuing the success of his previous smash single. Though not released as a single in the U.S., it was released as the 4th single in Canada. The girl part of the music video was shot at Las Canteras beach and at the adjacent Hotel Reina Isabel, Las Palmas de Gran Canaria, Spain.

In 2019, Astley recorded and released a 'Reimagined' version of the song for his album The Best of Me, which features a new piano arrangement.

Track listing
 7" single
 "Whenever You Need Somebody" — 3:26
 "Just Good Friends" — 3:45

 7" single - Picture-disc
 "Whenever You Need Somebody" — 3:26
 "Just Good Friends" — 3:45
			
 12" maxi
 "Whenever You Need Somebody" (Lonely Hearts Mix) — 7:34
 "Whenever You Need Somebody" (Instrumental) — 3:50
 "Just Good Friends" — 3:45

 12" and cassette single
 "Whenever You Need Somebody" – 7:52
 "Whenever You Need Somebody" (Instrumental) – 4:38
 "Just Good Friends" – 3:40

 12" promo
 "Whenever You Need Somebody" (Lonely Hearts Mix) – 7:34
 "Whenever You Need Somebody" (7" version) – 3:27
 "Whenever You Need Somebody" (Remix) – 7:57
 "Whenever You Need Somebody" (Remix Dub) – 4:39

Charts

Weekly charts

Year-end charts

References

1987 singles
1988 singles
Number-one singles in Germany
Number-one singles in Sweden
Number-one singles in Switzerland
Rick Astley songs
Songs about loneliness
Song recordings produced by Stock Aitken Waterman
Songs written by Mike Stock (musician)
Songs written by Matt Aitken
Songs written by Pete Waterman
1985 songs
Magnet Records singles
RCA Records singles
Number-one singles in Italy